The Nationalist People's Movement (NVB) was a far-right political organization in the Netherlands. The NVB was founded in 2006 as a split from the National Alliance, likewise a right-wing extremist organization. The NVB's name, logo and mottoes resembled those of the collaborationist National Socialist Movement of World War II. According to the General Intelligence and Security Service, the NVB "virtually disappeared from the scene" in 2008.

Activities
The group claimed it focused on preserving and protecting the Dutch language and culture on the basis of European identity and Christian norms and values. The NVB tried to achieve its objectives by organizing demonstrations and meetings. The NVB also took part in the IJzerwake and maintained close ties with Voorpost.

Confrontations
 In February 2007, the NVB held a party meeting in Uitgeest, which faced protests from anti-fascists. The confrontation between the two sides led to a fight, in which the court would later designate the anti-fascists as the instigators.
 On Saturday, 22 September 2007, an NVB demonstration in the De Baarsjes district of Amsterdam was ended by police almost as soon as it began, after fighting had broken out between members of the NVB and a group of anti-fascist activists and F-side football hooligans. The demonstration had been prompted by the relocation of a war memorial from the site of the planned Westermoskee.

References

2006 establishments in the Netherlands
2008 disestablishments in the Netherlands
Defunct nationalist parties in the Netherlands
Neo-Nazism in the Netherlands
Political parties established in 2006
Political parties disestablished in 2008